Barranquitas is a small mountain town and municipality located in the Cordillera Central region of Puerto Rico, south of Corozal and Naranjito; north of Coamo and Aibonito; west of Comerío and Cidra; and east of Orocovis. Barranquitas is spread over 6 barrios and Barranquitas Pueblo (the downtown area and the administrative center of the city). It is part of the San Juan-Caguas-Guaynabo Metropolitan Statistical Area.

Barranquitas is about one hour by winding roads from San Juan, the capital. It is nestled amid hills and mountains, and nearby, between Barranquitas and Aibonito, is the San Cristóbal Canyon; one of the deepest canyons in the West Indies. For years, the overlook was used as a municipal garbage; in the last decade, the refuse was removed and the site restored.

History

Barranquitas's local Taino Indian Cacique (Chief) was called Orocobix and his yucayeque or tribe was known as the Jatibonicu Taino.

The town was founded in 1803 by Antonio Aponte Ramos.
Early in the 20th century, Barranquitas residents, known as Barranquiteños, had a short but legendary territory war with residents of the city of Comerío.

In 1899, the United States Department of War conducted a census of Puerto Rico finding that the population of Barranquitas was 8,103.

Hurricane Maria on September 20, 2017, triggered numerous landslides in Barranquitas with its significant amount of rainfall and its nearly category 5 winds. Many residents did not receive help for weeks after the hurricane made landfall as entry into the municipality was hampered by downed trees and telephone poles, landslides, and highways that had split in two.

In Barranquitas, up to 1000 homes, and its highways were destroyed by landslides. Forty days after the hurricane, none of Barranquitas' 29,000 residents had their electrical power restored. Barranquitas' agriculture industry was decimated with one farmer saying he'd lost his five thousand plantain trees,  apio, and other minor crops.

Scenes around Barranquitas after Hurricane María:

Geography
Barranquitas is a landlocked municipality in the middle of the Cordillera Central of Puerto Rico, the main mountain range that crosses the island from west to east. It is bordered by the municipalities of Corozal, Naranjito, Coamo, Aibonito, Orocovis, and Comerío. Barranquitas has a surface area of 34 square miles (88.4 km2).

The terrain is mostly mountainous. Some of the peaks found in the municipality are La Torrecilla and Farallón. Barranquitas is also the site of the San Cristóbal Canyon and Las Bocas Canyon.

Water features
Rivers of Barranquitas include the Río de Barranquitas, Río Grande de Manatí, Piñonas, Río Hondo, and Río Usabón.

There are 14 bridges in Barranquitas.

Barrios

Like all municipalities of Puerto Rico, Barranquitas is subdivided into barrios.

 Barrancas
Barranquitas barrio-pueblo
 Cañabón
 Helechal
 Honduras
 Palo Hincado
 Quebrada Grande
 Quebradillas

Sectors
Barrios (which are like minor civil divisions) and subbarrios, in turn, are further subdivided into smaller local populated place areas/units called sectores (sectors in English). The types of sectores may vary, from normally sector to urbanización to reparto to barriada to residencial, among others.

Special Communities

 (Special Communities of Puerto Rico) are marginalized communities whose citizens are experiencing a certain amount of social exclusion.  A map shows these communities occur in nearly every municipality of the commonwealth. Of the 742 places that were on the list in 2014, the following barrios, communities, sectors, or neighborhoods were in Barranquitas: El Amparo neighborhood, Cañabón barrio, La Vega neighborhood, Calle Abajo (Calle Melitón Pérez), La Loma, La Torre, Los Pinos, Quebrada Grande barrio, and Tres Caminos.

Energy consortium
An Energy Consortium was signed in late February of 2019, by Villalba, Orocovis, Morovis, Ciales and Barranquitas municipalities. The consortium is the first of its kind on the commonwealth and intends to have these municipalities work together, to safeguard their communities, in the event of a catastrophe, by creating resilient, and efficient energy networks with backups.

Tourism

Landmarks
Barranquitas is the burial place of two prominent Puerto Rican politicians; Luis Muñoz Rivera (who was born in the town) and his son, Governor Luis Muñoz Marín (who was born in San Juan). This has made Barranquitas a popular tourist attraction among Puerto Ricans. The birthplace of Muñoz Rivera has been converted into a museum. The mausoleum of the Muñoz Rivera family is a place of interest. Among those buried there are Muñoz Rivera and his son and daughter-in-law, Luis Muñoz Marín, and his second wife Inés Mendoza de Muñoz.

Other known places of interest in Barranquitas are the San Cristóbal Canyon, Las Bocas Canyon, and the ruins of Hacienda Margarita. El Cortijo Castle is an old, historical structure, which is currently a museum. Camp Morton is a popular spot for activities and retreats.

To stimulate local tourism during the COVID-19 pandemic in Puerto Rico, the Puerto Rico Tourism Company launched the Voy Turistiendo (I'm Touring) campaign in 2021. The campaign featured a passport book with a page for each municipality.

Culture

Festivals and events

Barranquitas celebrates its patron saint festival in June. The  is a religious and cultural celebration that generally features parades, games, artisans, amusement rides, regional food, and live entertainment.

Other festivals and events celebrated in Barranquitas include:
 Apio Festival or  – April/May
 National Crafts Fair of Barranquitas – July and has been celebrated for over 50 years
 Viva Mi Calle Festival – November
 Lighting of Christmas Tree – December

Sports
Barranquitas doesn't have professional sports teams, but there are some amateur sports teams based in the city. The most popular amateur sport is baseball. The team of Barranquitas is known as the "Proceres" (is an adjective for an important person in history) due to the fact that the town has been the birthplace for many historical figures. The other popular sport is volleyball.

Economy

Agriculture

Some of the crops grown in Barranquitas include plantain, coffee, lemon, ají dulce, yam, and other fruits and vegetables. The main crop in Barranquitas is the apio. The apio is a root vegetable (from the legume Apios tuberosa / Apios Americana), and it is eaten like potatoes (not to be confused with celeriac).

Industry
Footwear and clothing is manufactured in Barranquitas.

Demographics

Many of the Puerto Ricans born in the town are known to have light-colored eyes and have strong European features. Some also have an apparent mestizo look to them. The reason for this phenomenon is due to the migration of many Taino Indians during the Spanish colonization. Tainos often fled to the mountainous region to escape slavery. Many poor Spanish and other European immigrants moved to this region as well and settled as coffee growers. Eventually, the Taino and European immigrants intermarried and created what is called the "mestizo".

Government

All municipalities in Puerto Rico are administered by a mayor, elected every four years. The current mayor of Barranquitas is Elliot Colon Blanco, of the New Progressive Party (PNP). He was elected at the 2018 primaries and the re-elected on General Elections of 2020.

The city belongs to the Puerto Rico Senatorial district VI, which is represented by two senators.

Symbols
The  has an official flag and coat of arms.

Flag
The flag of the municipality consists of three horizontal stripes; white on the upper edge representing the silver enamel of the town's shield, green in the center representing the vegetation and yellow on the lower edge representing the gold enamel of the ravines of the San Cristóbal Canyon.

Coat of arms
The coat of arms of Barranquitas has silver, a canyon, two ravines, gold slopes, a tree, gold leaves, a bell and a crown. The ravines are reminders of the San Cristóbal Canyon, located in the territorial boundary of Barranquitas and Aibonito, a neighboring municipality. The yagrumo trees are characteristic of the high mountainous areas of Puerto Rico and symbolize the elevation of Barranquitas.

Education
The Interamerican University of Puerto Rico has a campus in Barranquitas.

All public schools in Puerto Rico are administered by the Puerto Rico Department of Education. The schools located in Barranquitas are the following:
Many of the schools in Barranquitas educate children on agriculture and cultivating crops.

See also

List of Puerto Ricans
History of Puerto Rico

References

Further reading

External links 
 Puerto Rico Government Directory

Barranquitas, Puerto Rico
Municipalities of Puerto Rico
Energy in Puerto Rico